De Vlugtlaan is a metro station on Line 50 and Line 51 in Amsterdam, the Netherlands. Between 1986 and 2000, Amsterdam De Vlugtlaan railway station was in use on the railway running parallel next to the metro line.

History
The railway station opened on 1 June 1986 together with the western section of the Amsterdam Ring railway. The station was originally to be called Burgemeester De Vlugtlaan, named after , Mayor of Amsterdam from 1921 to 1941. However, the "Burgemeester" ("mayor") was eventually dropped. The station was designed by Rob Steenhuis, architect of over then stations in the Netherlands in the period from 1982 to 1996. The station was only served by local trains from Hoofdorp and Schiphol to Lelystad or Amersfoort Schothorst.

On 1 June 1997, metro line 50 opened next to the station and the metro stop was called De Vlugtlaan. The original construction of the railway station needed to be amended by demolishing one of the stairs leading to the railway platforms and half of the station hall. The railway station had to close in May 2000 due to the construction of the Hemboog.

Vlugtlaan
Vlugtlaan
Railway stations opened in 1986
Railway stations closed in 2000
Railway stations on the Westtak Ringspoorbaan